Didier Norberto Merchán Cardona (born 26 July 1999) is a Colombian cyclist, who currently rides for UCI Continental team .

Major results
2019
 1st Stage 10 Clásico RCN
2020
 2nd Overall Vuelta al Tolima
1st Stage 3
 3rd Overall Clásico RCN
2021
 1st  Overall Vuelta a Antioquia
 1st Giro del Medio Brenta
2022
 3rd Overall Vuelta al Táchira
1st Stage 8
2023
 4th Road race, National Road Championships

References

External links

1999 births
Living people
Colombian male cyclists
People from Líbano, Tolima
21st-century Colombian people